Ancylolomia longicorniella is a moth in the family Crambidae. It was described by Shi-Mei Song and Tie-Mei Chen in 2004. It is found in China (Guangdong).

References

Ancylolomia
Moths described in 2004
Moths of Asia